The 2014 European Rallycross Championship was the thirty-eighth season of the FIA European Championships for Rallycross Drivers. The season consisted of five rounds, commencing on 24 May with the British round at Lydden Hill Race Circuit, and culminating on 28 September, at Italy at Franciacorta.

The Supercar title was won by Sweden's Robin Larsson, while the supporting Super 1600 and  titles were won by Sergej Zagumennov and Daniel Lundh respectively.

Calendar

Entries

Supercar

Super1600

TouringCar

RX Lites Cup

Results and standings

Supercar

Super1600

TouringCar

RX Lites

References

External links
 

European Rallycross Championship
Rallycross Championship
European Rallycross Championship seasons